The Adventurers is a 1970 American adventure drama film directed, produced, and co-written by Lewis Gilbert. It is based on the 1966 novel of the same name by Harold Robbins.

The film stars Bekim Fehmiu, Candice Bergen, Charles Aznavour, Olivia de Havilland, Fernando Rey, Ernest Borgnine, Alan Badel, and Leigh Taylor-Young. The film was the American film debut of Yugoslavian actor Fehmiu and was shot in Europe and parts of South America. It is loosely based on the life of Dominican diplomat and playboy Porfirio Rubirosa.

Plot
Dax Xenos, a ten-year old boy in the South American country of Corteguay, witnesses the rape and murder of his mother by government soldiers and runs to his father, Jaime, who is with a band of revolutionaries. Jaime's men capture the government soldiers, give Dax the privilege of personally executing his mother's murderers, and then take the boy to their hideout in the mountains where he meets Amparo, the daughter of revolutionary leader Rojo. After the rebels oust the dictator and establish Rojo as president, Dax accompanies his father to Rome, where Jaime is to serve as ambassador.

Years later, Jaime returns to Corteguay to find that Rojo has established himself as dictator; he contacts El Condor, the new revolutionary leader, but is killed by Colonel Gutierrez, Rojo's security chief. Dax, now a young man, returns to Corteguay for his father's funeral. Rojo persuades Dax, who does not know the cause of his father's death, to convince El Condor to surrender, but when El Condor surrenders, he is killed by Gutierrez.

Because his promise to El Condor was betrayed, Dax murders Gutierrez, confronts Rojo with his treachery, and returns to Rome. He becomes a gigolo and finally marries millionairess Sue Anne Daley, but they soon divorce. Dax again returns to Corteguay, this time for the unveiling of a statue of his father, and finds himself thrust into yet another revolution.

Led this time by El Lobo, the revolution succeeds when Dax murders Rojo. Meanwhile, Dax learns that Amparo has borne him a son. Delighted, he sends her back to Rome with the intention of establishing a democracy in Corteguay and returning to his new family, but he is assassinated by the vengeful son of El Condor.

Cast

Music
The score was composed by Bossa nova songwriter Antonio Carlos Jobim. Of the 12 songs featured in this film, three of them, "Children's Games" (Chovendo na Roseira), "A Bed of Flowers For Sue Ann" (Sue Ann) and "Dax & Amparo-Love Theme" (Olha Maria), went on to become some of Jobim's signature songs. These songs were heard for the first time on this soundtrack. The soft and often tender music stands in stark contrast to the darkness of the themes of the story.
A rare track by British band Family called "Young Love" was featured as a backing track to a fashion show in the film. This track does not appear on a CD by Family or on any singles.

Release and reception
The Adventurers had a special "airborne world premiere" on February 23, 1970, as the in-flight movie of a TWA Boeing 747 Superjet making its premiere voyage, flying from New York to Los Angeles, with the film's stars and members of the press aboard. It marked the first time that a movie and a plane premiered in the same event. A wide release took place at over 100 U.S. theaters on March 25, 1970.

The pre-wide release version ran 205 minutes and was negatively received by the press; Paramount re-cut the film at the last minute but several critics, including Pauline Kael and Joe Morgenstern, could not be convinced to watch it a second time.

Howard Thompson of The New York Times opened his review by stating, "On the screen, 'The Adventurers' turn out to be an even duller bunch of meatballs than they were in Harold Robbins's best-selling novel." Arthur D. Murphy of Variety called it "a classic monument to bad taste ... marked by profligate and squandered production opulence; inferior, imitative and curiously old-hat direction; banal, ludicrous dialog; sub-standard, lifeless and embarrassing acting; cornball music; indulgent, gratuitous and boring violence; and luridly non-erotic sex." Gene Siskel of the Chicago Tribune gave the film 1 star out of 4 and wrote, "'The Adventurers' has nothing to recommend it. It is not erotic. It is not funny. It is violent to the point of obscenity and is as much the story of why film companies are losing millions as it is the story of Harold Robbins' best-selling novel."

Kevin Thomas of the Los Angeles Times stated that the film "is blatant in its borrowing from the more sensational headlines and naked in its manipulation of emotions to the susceptible," adding that "Gilbert is nothing if not consistent: the acting and the relentlessly risible dialogue are uniformly terrible." Gary Arnold of The Washington Post wrote, "Unfortunately, Lewis Gilbert's film version of the novel is quite faithful to the letter and spirit of the original. It alternates from slaughter to torpor to sex to torpor and back again to slaughter. Whatever the mode, the scenes are usually hideous or clumsy on their own terms and useless as clues to subsequent events or the characters' motives." The Monthly Film Bulletin called it "A three-hour slog through every imaginable cliché of writing and direction" and further remarked, "This might be described as the film with everything; trouble is, it is difficult to imagine anybody wanting any of it."

By the 2000s, reviews have found The Adventurers entertaining as an unintentional comedy. In 2005, it was listed in The Official Razzie Movie Guide as one of the Top Ten Best Bad films of all time, with author John Wilson writing that the movie "ha[s] not even one believable character, performance, or line of dialogue. But it’s all done with such utter sincerity that it’s far more entertaining than this same material would be in the hands of anyone but utter incompetents." Paul Mavis, reviewing the Warner Archive DVD release for Movies & Drinks, enjoyed its outrageousness, stating The Adventurers is, "part faux-David Lean, part lurid comic book with funny accents and naked breasts--and all of it an irresistible, frequently maddening mess." He believes that the mixing of Third World politics and jet-setting was inspired by international playboy Porfirio Rubirosa.

Director Lewis Gilbert said on June 25, 2010, on the BBC radio program Desert Island Discs, that The Adventurers was "a big, sprawling, very expensive film which was a disaster. I should never have made it. It's one I'm not proud of."

Home media
Paramount Home Entertainment first released the film on a widescreen DVD on July 12, 2005. The same company rereleased the film in the Warner Archive Collection on September 24, 2013. The DVD was edited and re-rated PG, with significant cuts to scenes in which women are raped and killed by soldiers.

See also
 List of American films of 1970

References

External links 
 

1970 films
1970s adventure drama films
American adventure drama films
1970s English-language films
Films based on American novels
Films directed by Lewis Gilbert
Films set in South America
Films set in a fictional country
Films shot in Colombia
Films shot in Italy
Films à clef
Paramount Pictures films
Embassy Pictures films
1970 drama films
Films scored by Antônio Carlos Jobim
1970s American films